Madagascar: Escape 2 Africa (also known as Madagascar 2: Escape  to Africa) is a 2008 American computer-animated adventure comedy film produced by DreamWorks Animation and Pacific Data Images and distributed by Paramount Pictures. It is the sequel to Madagascar (2005) and the second installment in the franchise. It was directed by Eric Darnell and Tom McGrath, with a screenplay written by Etan Cohen, Darnell, and McGrath, and features Ben Stiller, Chris Rock, David Schwimmer, Jada Pinkett Smith, Sacha Baron Cohen, Cedric the Entertainer, Andy Richter, Elisa Gabrielli, McGrath, Chris Miller, Christopher Knights, and Conrad Vernon reprising their voice acting roles from the first film, joined by new cast members Bernie Mac, Alec Baldwin, Sherri Shepherd, and will.i.am. In the film, the main characters—a party of animals from the Central Park Zoo whose adventures have taken them to Madagascar—find themselves in Africa, where they meet others of their species and where Alex the lion reunites with his parents.

Released on November 7, 2008, Madagascar: Escape 2 Africa received positive reviews from critics for its characters, humor and animation, and grossed $603.9 million on a $150 million budget, making it the sixth highest-grossing film of 2008. It was dedicated to Bernie Mac, who died before the film's release. A sequel, Madagascar 3: Europe's Most Wanted, was released in June 2012.

Plot
In Africa, a lion named Zuba tries to teach his son Alakay how to fight, but the cub is more interested in dancing. Makunga challenges Zuba for the title of alpha lion. During their fight, Alakay is captured by poachers, and Zuba gives chase. Zuba breaks the safety harness off of the crate containing Alakay, but is shot in the ear and incapacitated. The crate containing Alakay falls into the ocean and drifts to New York City, where he is renamed Alex and grows up at the Central Park Zoo where he meets his lifelong best friends: Marty, Melman, and Gloria.

Years later, following their adventure in Madagascar, the zoo animals—Alex, Marty, Melman, Gloria, the penguins, and the chimpanzees—prepare to return to New York aboard a battered airplane piloted by the penguins, accompanied by King Julien, Maurice, and Mort. The plane runs out of fuel and crash lands in continental Africa. The animals find themselves at a watering hole on a nature reserve, and are excited to meet others of their species. Alex is reunited with his parents and impresses them with tales of his status as "the king of New York". Marty fits in with a herd of other zebras who look and sound just like him. Melman, a hypochondriac, is distressed that the reserve has no doctors, so the other giraffes appoint him their witch doctor. Seeking romance, Gloria attracts the attention of the smooth-talking male hippo Moto Moto. Meanwhile, the penguins set about repairing the plane, assisted by numerous chimpanzees recruited by Mason and Phil. They steal vehicles from several groups of humans who are on safari and strip them for parts. Nana, a tough old woman who attacked Alex in Grand Central Station, takes charge of the stranded tourists and helps them survive in the wilderness.

The zoo animals' excitement soon turns to disappointment. In a scheme to oust Zuba as alpha lion, Makunga insists that Alex complete a rite of passage which Alex mistakes for a talent contest. It is actually a fighting contest, and Makunga tricks him into choosing the strongest lion as his opponent, resulting in Alex's humiliating defeat. Faced with the duty of banishing his son, Zuba relinquishes his title as alpha and Makunga takes over. Meanwhile, Marty is dejected by the realization that the other zebras can do everything he can, believing himself no longer unique. Melman comes to believe that he is deathly ill and, having secretly loved Gloria for a long time, is saddened by Gloria's interest in Moto Moto. The four friends argue heatedly with one another. Gloria has a date with Moto Moto, but loses interest when she realizes he is only attracted to her because of her size. After a pep talk from King Julien, Melman finally reveals his feelings for Gloria.

The next day, the animals panic when the watering hole dries up. Determined to redeem himself, Alex mends his friendship with Marty and they leave the reserve to investigate upriver. King Julien suggests that offering a sacrifice to the nearby volcano will restore the water. Melman, forlorn and believing he is dying, volunteers to be sacrificed. Gloria stops him from jumping into the volcano, and realizes that he loves her for more than her appearance. Alex and Marty discover that the stranded New Yorkers have built a camp and dammed up the river, and Alex is captured by them. Zuba rushes to his aid, but Alex saves them both by dancing for the tourists, who remember him fondly from the zoo. Marty, Melman, Gloria, the penguins, and the chimpanzees (after settling a strike by the chimpanzees) arrive in the repaired airplane and help Alex destroy the dam, restoring the water. Makunga angrily makes a stand for control, but Alex tricks him into being subdued by Nana. Zuba offers Alex the title of alpha lion, but he declines, believing the title belongs to his father. Zuba claims the title belongs to them both, and father and son become co-leaders.

Skipper marries a bobblehead doll from the plane, and he, the other penguins, and the chimpanzees head off to honeymoon in Monte Carlo. Alex, Marty, Melman, Gloria, and the lemurs happily decide to stay on the reserve for a while.

Voice cast

 Ben Stiller as Alex the lion
 Quinn Dempsey Stiller, Ben Stiller's son, as Alex as a baby, known as Alakay
 Declan Swift as young Alex
 Chris Rock as Marty the zebra, as well as the other zebras in the herd
 Thomas Stanley as young Marty
 David Schwimmer as Melman the giraffe
 Zachary Gordon as young Melman
 Jada Pinkett Smith as Gloria the hippopotamus
 Willow Smith as young Gloria
 Sacha Baron Cohen as King Julien XIII the ring-tailed lemur
 Cedric the Entertainer as Maurice the aye-aye
 Andy Richter as Mort the Goodman's mouse lemur
 Bernie Mac as Zuba, Alex's father and the alpha lion
 Sherri Shepherd as Alex's mother and Zuba's mate. Her name is not given in either the film nor credits, but she is named Florrie in the novelization.
 Alec Baldwin as Makunga, a lion who rivals Zuba for the position of alpha
 Elisa Gabrielli as Nana
 will.i.am as Moto Moto, a hippopotamus who is attracted to Gloria
 Tom McGrath as Skipper the penguin
 Chris Miller as Kowalski the penguin
 Christopher Knights as Private the penguin
 John DiMaggio as Rico the penguin, who only communicates in grunts
 Conrad Vernon as Mason the chimpanzee (Phil, the other main chimpanzee, is unvoiced)
 Fred Tatasciore as Teetsi the lion and as one of the poachers who captures Alakay
 Eric Darnell as Joe the giraffe and as one of the poachers who captures Alakay
 Al Roker as a newscaster
 Phil LaMarr as Safari Tour Guide
 Stephen Kearin as Stephen the giraffe, as a rhinoceros, and as one of the New Yorkers
 Danny Jacobs as one of the New Yorkers
 Dan O'Connor as a buffalo and as one of the New Yorkers
 Stacy Ferguson as a female hippopotamus
 Harland Williams as a giraffe
 Bridget Hoffman as one of the New Yorkers
 David P. Smith as Bobby the dik-dik
 John Eric Bentley provided additional voices

Production
A sequel to Madagascar had been in development since 2005, when the first film had been released, with a release date planned for late 2008. In the first teaser trailer, which was released in March 2008, the film was subtitled with The Crate Escape. By June 2008, the film was given its final title – Escape 2 Africa.

Reception

Critical response
The website's consensus reads, "Madagascar: Escape 2 Africa is an improvement on the original, with more fleshed-out characters, crisper animation and more consistent humor." Another review aggregator, Metacritic classified the film into the "generally favorable reviews" category with 61/100 approval rating based on 25 reviews, also a bit higher a score than the original. Audiences polled by CinemaScore gave the film an average grade of "A–" on an A+ to F scale.

Michael Phillips of the Chicago Tribune stated in his review that the film "goes easy on the pop culture jokes, I should clarify: one of the smarter things in the script is how Alex, who digs his Bob Fosse and Jerome Robbins dance moves, becomes the film's primary pop-cult gag." Roger Ebert of the Chicago Sun-Times gave the film 3/4 stars and wrote "This is a brighter, more engaging film than the original Madagascar. John Anderson of Newsday gave the film 3.5/4 stars and stated "Madagascar 2: Escape to Africa, the sequel to the enormously successful DreamWorks adventure and a film that hews close to the whole Lion King/species-as-destiny/self-fulfillment paradigm." Joe Morgenstern of The Wall Street Journal wrote: "The roots are shallow, but the sequel is good-natured, high-spirited and perfectly enjoyable if you take it for what it is." Jim Schembri of The Age gave the film 3.5/5 stars, describing it as a "hugely entertaining, lightning-fast, ceaselessly funny follow-up to the adorable 2005 animated hit", and deemed it one of the best animated films of 2008. Kelly Jane Torrance of The Washington Times gave the film 3/5 stars, writing that it "might not offer audiences cutting-edge animation or a particularly original story", but added: "It still has a lot going for it, though: foot-tapping music, laughs for young and old and the prodigious talents of Sacha Baron Cohen."

Shubra Gupta of The Indian Express wrote that the film was "as spunky, witty and funny" as its predecessor, and praised the animation and characters, but criticized the story for "[taking] the same course as The Lion King, with a detour towards Shrek thrown in." Carrie Rickey of The Philadelphia Inquirer gave the film 2/4 stars and wrote: "Take the flat tire that was Madagascar. Retread it with The Lion King storyline. Pump it up with air. Now you have Madagascar: Escape 2 Africa." Peter Bradshaw of The Guardian gave the film 2/5 stars, describing it as "a frankly disappointing piece of opportunism, with a non-plot which shamelessly rips off The Lion King." Anthony Quinn of The Independent also gave the film 2/5 stars, writing: "The visual invention and draughtsmanship are mightily impressive; a shame the drama's a bit of a bore."

Box office
On its opening day, the film grossed $17,555,027 from 4,056 theaters with a $4,328 average. It went to be at No. 1 at the box office with $63,106,589 with $15,559 average per theater. As of March 19, 2009, it achieved a gross of $180,010,950 (29.8% of total gross) in the United States and Canada along with a gross of  $423,889,404 (70.2%) in other regions adding to a worldwide gross total of $603,900,354.

Accolades

Music

Hans Zimmer returned to compose the score for the film, this time being joined by will.i.am. The soundtrack includes five new songs performed by will.i.am; his cover of "I Like to Move It" was used in the end credits.

Enhanced videos

Home media
Madagascar: Escape 2 Africa was released on DVD and Blu-ray Disc on February 6, 2009, along with two episodes from The Penguins of Madagascar series: "Popcorn Panic" and "Gone in a Flash". In the first week at the DVD sales chart, Madagascar opened at No. 1, selling 1,681,938 units which translated to $27.09m in revenue. As of April 2010, 13.7 million home entertainment units were sold worldwide.

The Madagascar: Escape 2 Africa - Movie Storybook was written by Rob Scotton and illustrated by Michael Koelsch, and was published by HarperCollins Children's Books in 2008. Koelsch had previously illustrated the Madagascar - Movie Storybook for Scholastic in 2005.

Video game

A video game based on the film was made for the Xbox 360, PlayStation 3, Wii, PlayStation 2, Microsoft Windows, and Nintendo DS, and released on November 4, 2008, in North America. The video game's gameplay is similar to the first movie's video game with the same characters and moves, although the environment is set in Africa.

Sequel

A sequel titled Madagascar 3: Europe's Most Wanted was released on June 8, 2012. Alex the Lion, Marty the Zebra, Gloria the Hippo, and Melman the Giraffe are still fighting to get home to New York. This time their journey takes them to a traveling circus in Europe which they will reinvent Madagascar style.

Notes

References

External links

Video game
 for the video game

Madagascar (franchise) films
2008 films
2008 computer-animated films
2000s American animated films
2000s buddy comedy films
American buddy comedy films
American children's animated comedy films
American computer-animated films
American sequel films
Animated buddy films
Animated films about apes
Animated films about mammals
Animated films about penguins
Animated films about animals
Animated films about lions
DreamWorks Animation animated films
Films directed by Eric Darnell
Films directed by Tom McGrath
Films with screenplays by Etan Cohen
Films scored by Hans Zimmer
Films set in Madagascar
IMAX films
Paramount Pictures films
Paramount Pictures animated films
2008 comedy films
2000s English-language films